Bolshiye Goly is a rural locality (a village) in Kachugsky District of Irkutsk Oblast, Russia, located on the Lena River.

History
According to the locals, the village was established in 1720. Throughout its existence, the majority of its inhabitants have had jobs based around arable farming and cattle cultivation. In the 18th-19th centuries, the village was famous for manufacturing of the big and small boats.

Notable people
Roman Mashkov, the Hero of the Soviet Union, was born in the village on September 22, 1922. He left for the war front in October 1941 and returned in 1945 to continue working in the village.

References

Notes

Sources

Rural localities in Irkutsk Oblast
Populated places established in 1720
1720 establishments in Russia
Populated places on the Lena River